Pumpkin in coconut cream, known in Thai as fakthong kaeng buat, is a traditional Thai sweet dish. The dish is one of the most famous local sweets.

The history of fakthong kaeng buat is unknown. According to most researches,  this dish might have been introduced by local people in the Northeast of Thailand. (Napasorn Phrayalaw, 2012)

See also
 List of Thai desserts
 List of squash and pumpkin dishes

References

Thai desserts and snacks
Squash and pumpkin dishes